Neaira is a monotypic genus of African seed bugs in the tribe Mictini, erected by Linnavuori in 1973.  It contains the species Neaira intermedia (García Varela, 1913 - originally described as Hoplopterna intermedia García Varela).

References

External links
 

Coreidae genera
Coreinae